E Line or Line E may refer to:

Transport 
 E (New York City Subway service)
 E (S-train), in Copenhagen, Denmark
 E Line (RTD), in the Denver-Aurora Metropolitan Area, Colorado
 Line E (Buenos Aires Underground)
 E Line (Los Angeles Metro), a light rail line in Los Angeles County, California
 E (Los Angeles Railway), former streetcar service
 RapidRide E Line, in Seattle, Washington
 E Line (Minnesota), a planned bus rapid transit line in Minneapolis
 E Embarcadero, streetcar line in San Francisco

Other uses 
 E-line (power line communication)
 Ethernet Private Line

See also
 E Train (disambiguation)